Herbert Reah Harper (23 June 1871 – 27 July 1956) was a British born, Australian electrical engineer who played an important role in the development of first the Melbourne electric supply and then the State Electricity Commission of Victoria.

Personal life

Harper was born in London on 23 June 1871 to parents James Harper, a commercial traveller and Hannah, née Reah. Harper attended Dulwich College and studied engineering at the City and Guilds Technical College, Finsbury, then took up an apprenticeship at the Rennoldson Electrical Engineering Company, a Tyneside engineering firm located in South Shields, gaining experience in marine engineering.

He was engaged in England to Eva Beatrice Ellis, whom he married at St Alban's Church, Armadale in Melbourne on 11 January 1902 and had four children. He died at Toorak on 27 July 1956.

British engineering work

In 1893 he began work at the Brush Electrical Engineering Company and in 1895 he supervised the installation of electric supply in Malta for that firm, staying on as chief engineer for the power authority. On return to England he supervised a number of tramway and town lighting systems. In 1889 he was sent to Melbourne as assistant to F. W. Clements, to manage the Brush Electrical Engineering Co subsidiary Electric Light and Traction Co.

Australian roles

Harper became electrical engineer to the Melbourne City Council in 1901 (replacing Arthur Arnot), where he was involved in the expansion of the generation and distribution system including introducing three-phase transmission and a new generator at Spencer Street Power Station.

Harper was correspondent to the London Institution of Electrical Engineers and American Institute of Electrical Engineers, and following an overseas tour in 1911, recognised the potential for Victorian brown coal, after seeing Germany's use.  He recommended the establishment of a public utility on the lines of the Ontario Hydro Electricity and was appointed to the government brown coal advisory committee (chaired by Department of Mines director Hyman Herman). This led to him becoming the first chief engineer on the State Electricity Commission of Victoria retiring in 1936.

Awards and civic roles

 Electrical Supply Association of Australia (inaugural president 1918) 
 Wallaby Club (president 1923)
 Institution of Engineers, Australia (president 1933) 
 Army Mechanization Board (1941–45)
 Kernot Medal (The Melbourne University Engineering Foundation) 1935
 Peter Nicol Russell Medal (Institution of Engineers, Australia) 1938
 East St Kilda Anglican Church warden 
 Melbourne Church of England Girls' Grammar School council

He is commemorated by the Monash University Harper Power Laboratory.

References

 Herbert Reah Harper, Electric Supply in Victoria, Victorian Institute of Engineers, 1917
 Edwards, C. Brown Power, Melbourne, 1969
 SEC Magazine, Sept 1936, Aug-Sept 1956
 McCredden, T. C. "The Impact of Electricity on Victoria 1880-1920" (B.Com. thesis, University of Melbourne, 1977).
 Electricity Supply Dept, Melbourne City Council, Annual Report, papers and newspaper cuttings, City of Melbourne Archives.

People from Melbourne
1871 births
1956 deaths
Australian electrical engineers
Churchwardens